Knut Henry Haraldsen (born 14 December 1976) is a retired Norwegian football defender.

He was drafted into the senior team of IK Start from its youth section in 1996. Already the next year he went to Vålerenga, where he played throughout 2002, except for a season-long loan to Bryne in 2001. Haraldsen, who also played for Norway U21 and was a squad member for the 1998 UEFA European Under-21 Championship, got a spell abroad in Belgian K.V.C. Westerlo from 2003 to 2005 before returning to Norway's Hamarkameratene and finally Start.

References

1976 births
Living people
Sportspeople from Kristiansand
Norwegian footballers
IK Start players
Vålerenga Fotball players
Bryne FK players
K.V.C. Westerlo players
Hamarkameratene players
Association football defenders
Eliteserien players
Norwegian First Division players
Belgian Pro League players
Norwegian expatriate footballers
Expatriate footballers in Belgium
Norwegian expatriate sportspeople in Belgium
Norway under-21 international footballers